Anka Phawa (Quechua anka eagle or black-chested buzzard-eagle, phaway, phawa flight,  "eagle flight", also spelled Ancapahua) is a mountain in the Wansu mountain range in the Andes of Peru, about  high. It is situated in the Arequipa Region, La Unión Province, Puyca District.

References 

Mountains of Peru
Mountains of Arequipa Region